Bulli, an electoral district of the Legislative Assembly in the Australian state of New South Wales had two incarnations, from 1930 until 1971 and from 1991 until 1999.


Election results

Elections in the 1990s

1995

1991

1971 - 1991

Elections in the 1960s

1968

1965

1962

Elections in the 1950s

1959

1956

1955 by-election

1953

1950

Elections in the 1940s

1947

1944

1941

Elections in the 1930s

1938

1935

1933 by-election

1932

1930

Notes

References 

New South Wales state electoral results by district